The 2018 Super Rugby season was the 23rd season of Super Rugby, an annual rugby union competition organised by SANZAAR between teams from Argentina, Australia, Japan, New Zealand and South Africa. After two seasons in which 18 teams participated, the 2018 season reverted to a 15-team competition, consisting of three geographical conferences.

The South African franchises thereafter entered the newly renamed Pro14 competition, while the Western Force took part in the National Rugby Championship, the domestic Australia competition, while preparing to enter the new Global Rapid Rugby competition in 2019.

Competition format

In the group stages, there are 19 rounds of matches, with each team playing 16 matches and having two rounds of byes, resulting in a total of 120 matches. Teams play eight inter-conference matches and eight cross-conference matches; they play all the other teams in their conference twice - once at home and once away - and play once against four of the teams in each of the other two conferences.

The top team in each of the three conferences qualify for the quarterfinals, as do the next five teams with the best records across the three conferences, known as wildcards. The conference winners and best wildcard team hosted the quarterfinals. The quarterfinal winners progressed to the semifinal, and the winners of the semifinals advanced to the final.

Standings

Round-by-round

The table below shows each team's progression throughout the season. For each round, their cumulative points total is shown with the overall log position in brackets:

Matches

The fixtures for the 2018 Super Rugby competition were released on 21 September 2017. The following matches were played during the regular season:

Finals

The finals fixtures were as follows:

Quarterfinals

Semifinals

Final

Players

Squads

The following 2018 Super Rugby squads have been named:

Top scorers

The top ten try and point scorers during the 2018 Super Rugby season are:

Referees

The following refereeing panel was appointed by SANZAAR for the 2018 Super Rugby season:

Attendances

References

External links
 Super Rugby websites:
 Official Super Rugby website
 Australia Super Rugby website
 New Zealand Super Rugby website

 
2018
2018 in Argentine rugby union
2018 in Australian rugby union
2017–18 in Japanese rugby union
2018–19 in Japanese rugby union
2018 in New Zealand rugby union
2018 in South African rugby union
2018 rugby union tournaments for clubs